Souk El Kebabjia is one of the souks of the medina of Tunis. It is specialized in the trading of traditional clothing accessories. Its craftsmen are specialized in kbaïeb, plural kobba (silk and cotton yarns).

Location 
It is situated west of Al-Zaytuna Mosque, in parallel to Souk El Berka and close to Souk El Trouk from one end and to Souk Es Sekajine from the other end.

History 

The souk was constructed at the same time as Souk El Trouk by Yusuf Dey during the 17th century.

Products 
The souk has silk yarns for weaving traditional clothing.

Notes and references 

Kebabjia
Clothing retailers of Tunisia